Vesicle may refer to:

 In cellular biology or chemistry
 Vesicle (biology and chemistry), a supramolecular assembly of lipid molecules, like a cell membrane
 Synaptic vesicle

 In human embryology
 Vesicle (embryology), bulge-like features of the early neural tube during embryonic brain development
 Auditory vesicle
 Optic vesicles

 In human anatomy and morphology
 Seminal vesicle
 Vesicle (dermatology), a liquid-filled cavity under the epidermis, commonly called a blister

 In non-human morphology
 Subsporangial vesicle
 Juice vesicles, the pulp found in the endocarp of common citrus members

 In geology
 Vesicular texture, a small enclosed cavity found in some volcanic rock, such as basalt

See also 

 Vesical (disambiguation)